Marilyn Fleer  is an Australian professor of early childhood education and development at Monash University in Melbourne, Australia. She was awarded the Kathleen Fitzpatrick Australian Laureate Fellowship by the Australian Research Council in 2018.

Biography
Fleer grew up in Narrikup, Western Australia, a rural farming community. She graduated from the University of New England with a MEd in 1988. She moved to the University of Queensland where she completed a PhD in 1991.

Fleer's research is focused on early childhood "concept formation", in particular the developmental meaning of conceptual play. Her work has especially focused on how young children learn science, technology, engineering, and mathematics concepts through play.

She was elected Fellow of the Academy of the Social Sciences in Australia in November 2021.

Works

References 

Living people
Year of birth missing (living people)
Academic staff of Monash University
Australian psychologists
Australian women psychologists
Fellows of the Academy of the Social Sciences in Australia
University of New England (Australia) alumni
University of Queensland alumni